Public Commercial Assets are the assets owned by the public sector able to generate income if managed professionally.

Public Commercial Assets are a sub-sector of the asset side of the Public Sector Balance Sheet, that reports the totals of assets and liabilities that the government controls.

According to IMF research, total public sector assets have a value equivalent to 2×GDP globally. Net worth (assets minus liabilities) would be equivalent to some 21% of GDP.

Real estate is the single largest segment of all assets, globally. According to research from McKinsey Global Institute, Global net worth has risen as interest rates have fallen, since 2000 mainly due to the prices of real estate triple in value between 2000 to 2020. Most governments do not keep a complete record of all the real estate it owns, thus making it difficult to value, manage or develop and put these assets to their most productive uses.

References

Accounting terminology
Finance
Public finance